Kenneth Goff (September 19, 1914 - April 11, 1972) was an anti-Fluoride, Christian Identity, anti-Communist minister.  He was the 1944 national chairman of Gerald L. K. Smith's Christian Youth for America.

Biography

According to his biographical material, he was a member of the Communist Party of the United States of America (CPUSA) from May 2, 1936, to October 9, 1939, when he testified before the Dies Committee.  He claimed that while in the CPUSA he infiltrated youth organizations and worked for Communist front organizations, maintaining links with Communist leaders both in the U.S. and the U.S.S.R., in order to lay the groundwork for Communist revolution in the United States.  He also claimed that his testimony before the Dies Committee led to the dismissal of 169 federal employees. He died at the age of 57 in Chicago in 1972 during a speaking tour.

Following his appearance before the Dies Committee, Goff made numerous speaking tours and was the author of 28 books, numerous tracts and several periodicals, including from 1962-1967 The Pilgrim Torch. In his 1954 book, Hitler and the Twentieth Century Hoax, which denied the Holocaust, Goff claimed that Hitler was a Communist agent, hinted he was Jewish, and also that Hitler was still alive and would reappear to advance Communism. He also claimed that both hippies and desegregation were part of a Communist plot.  He told the Dies Committee that the Communists were in favor of water fluoridation, because they intended to take over water treatment plants and threaten to poison the water supply with fluoride if Americans did not surrender.

Goff's main influence on Christian Identity came through his leadership of the Soldiers of the Cross Training Institute, located in Evergreen, Colorado, which trained Christian Identity ministers, including Dan Gayman of the Church of Israel and Thomas Robb, pastor of the Christian Revival Center and National Director of The Knights Party (KKK).  The Institute  provided courses on Christianity, politics, survivalism and other subjects.

On The Joe Pyne Show Episode #12 1965, Joe Pyne asked Kenneth Goff if he were anti-Semitic. He dodged the question by saying Arabs are included in the term Semitic. Then, Joe Pyne said "Jesus was a Jew." Kenneth Goff said "Jesus could not be a Jew because Jesus was human and Jews aren't."

In his 1970 book, The Hoaxers: Plain Liars, Fancy Liars and Damned Liars, Morris Kominsky claimed that Goff was the author of Brain-Washing, a book that purported to be a condensation of a work by Lavrentiy Beria, the Soviet secret police chief.

Goff has also been attributed with creating the "strangled to death quote", which he falsely attributed to the CPUSA leader, Gus Hall.  The purported quote was:

I dream of the hour when the last congressman is strangled to death on the guts of the last preacher-and since the Christians seem to love to sing about the blood, why not give them a little of it? Slit the throats of their children [and] draw them over the mourners' bench and the pulpit and allow them to drown in their own blood, and then see whether they enjoy singing those hymns.

The quote is evocative of Denis Diderot, the eighteenth-century philosopher who allegedly wrote, "I should like to see ... the last king strangled with the guts of the last priest."  The evangelist Jerry Falwell used the false quote as late as 1980.

In 2011, the Royal Canadian Mounted Police released a 1960 letter from Goff to the anti-Communist writer Pat Walsh, which claimed that Canadian socialist leader Tommy Douglas had been active in Communist circles in the 1930s.  According to Goff, "Premier Douglas was a preacher in Chicago about the time I was a member of the Communist Party and he attended party rallies on the University campus presided over by Claude Lightfoot and Morris Childs".

Books
 Brainwashed Into Slavery, by Kenneth Goff, 63 pages 
 They would destroy our way of life (1944) 48 pages
 Traitors in the Pulpit and Treason Toward God (1946) 61 pages
 Confessions of Stalin's Agent (1948) 78 pages text
 Red betrayal of youth (1948) 32 pages
 The Soviet Art Of Brainwashing - A Synthesis of the Russian Textbook on Psychopolitics (1950)
 Will Russia Invade America? (1951) 63 pages
 Communism in America (1952)
 The scarlet woman of Revelation (1952) 32 pages
 One World a Red World (1952) 64 pages
 The Long Arm of Stalin (1952) 63 pages
 Hitler and the Twentieth Century Hoax (1954) 72 pages. Goff suggests Hitler was a communist agent and may have survived the fall of Berlin.
 Strange Fire (The Church, Christianity & Communism in America) (1954) hardcover
 The flying saucers: From Russia, from another planet, from God (1955) 32 pages
 AMERICA: Zion of God (1955) 80 pages
 Reds Promote Racial War (1958) 76 pages
 Red Shadows (1959) 93 pages
 Still 'tis Our Ancient Foe (1962)
 Red tide (1962) 63 pages
 Crackpot or crack shot (1964) 10 pages
 Satanism - the father of Communism (1968) 72 pages
 Red atrocities against Christians (1968) 63 pages 
 Reds launch war to destroy white race (1969)
 From Babylon to Baruch
 Pilgrim Torch (c.1946-1967)
 Christian Battle Cry (1966-1971)

See also
 Brain-Washing (book)
 Dr. Strangelove

References

External links

Kenneth Goff's FBI files, obtained under the FOIA and hosted at the Internet Archive:
Part 1 Part 2 Part 3 Part 4
Denver office part 1
Denver office part 1A
Denver office part 2
Denver office part 3
Denver office part 4
Denver office part 5

Christian Identity
1915 births
1972 deaths
Old Right (United States)
American conspiracy theorists
American Holocaust deniers
American anti-communists
Activists from Colorado